Daniel Ignacio Sasso Pacheco (born 12 November 1982) is a Venezuelan football manager.

Career
Born in Caracas, Sasso worked at Deportivo La Guaira's under-15 and under-16 squads before being named manager of the under-20 team in February 2018. He was also an assistant of Martín Carrillo in the Venezuela under-20 national team.

On 16 June 2021, Sasso was appointed manager of Primera División side Universidad Central. On 4 May of the following year, he left the club on a mutual agreement.

References

External links

1982 births
Living people
Sportspeople from Caracas
Venezuelan football managers
Venezuelan Primera División managers
Universidad Central de Venezuela F.C. managers